The Turkish Rugby League Association (TRLA) is a sports league in Turkey. They play rugby league. There are 9 teams; five teams are from Istanbul and four external, including Izmir, Ankara, Edirne and Antalya. New local competitions involving different forms of the game are developing including Izmir Rugby League which has five local teams which play Rugby League adapted for smaller fields. 

The TRLA is very popular in the cities of Istanbul and Eskisehir in Turkey, and is the biggest rugby league competition in Turkey. The first grand final took place on 25 March 2017. Though the organisation officially launched in 2016, preparation began the previous year, as rules were translated into Turkish that October. In September 2017, Turkey's official rugby union organisation, the Turkish Rugby Federation, said that they would ban any prospective rugby league players, following a similar move in the UAE.

Teams
The following teams are members of the TRLA:

Istanbul teams

 Bilgi Badgers
 Bosphorus Wolves
 Kadikoy Bulls 
 İstanbul Dragons

Teams external to Istanbul

 İzmir Zaferi 
 Antalya Warriors
 Ankara Phyrgians 
 Eskişehir Aqua Warriors 
 Trakya Gladiators

See also
 Turkey national rugby league team

References

External links

Rugby league in Turkey
Rugby league governing bodies in Europe
Rugby league
Sports leagues established in 2016
2016 establishments in Turkey
Professional sports leagues in Turkey